Gazeta de Transilvania was the first Romanian-language newspaper to be published in Transylvania. It was founded by George Bariț in 1838 in Brașov. It played a very important role in the awakening of the Romanian national conscience in Transylvania, and sowed the seeds for the revolution of 1848.

Bibliography 
 Academia Republicii Populare Romîne, Dicţionar Enciclopedic Romîn, Editura Politică, București, 1962–1964.

External links 
 Digitized Gazeta de Transilvania (1838-1852) at Lucian Blaga Central University Library of Cluj-Napoca, Romania
 About Gazeta de Transilvania (Romanian) at Lucian Blaga Central University Library, Cluj-Napoca, Romania

Romanian-language newspapers
Newspapers established in 1838
1838 establishments in the Austrian Empire